Sabine Spitz (born 27 December 1971 in Herrischried, Baden-Württemberg) is a German cross country cyclist. She won bronze in Women's cross-country at the 2004 Summer Olympics, silver in the event in the 2012 Summer Olympics and gold in the event in the 2008 Summer Olympics. Furthermore, she became World Champion in 2003. At the 2016 Summer Olympics, she finished in 19th place.

In March 2017, Spitz raced her second eight-day Absa Cape Epic stage race in South Africa. She and South African partner Robyn de Groot were the pre-race favourites for the Women's Category but Spitz had a problematic ride: she crashed badly on two stages and these setbacks ultimately cost them any chance of victory. They eventually finished the 651 km route in third place. In 2016 she and Ukrainian Yana Belomoina had finished second in the race, which takes place in the Western Cape each year.

References

External links
 
 
 

1971 births
Living people
People from Waldshut (district)
Sportspeople from Freiburg (region)
German female cyclists
Cyclists at the 2000 Summer Olympics
Cyclists at the 2004 Summer Olympics
Cyclists at the 2008 Summer Olympics
Cyclists at the 2012 Summer Olympics
Cyclists at the 2016 Summer Olympics
Olympic cyclists of Germany
Olympic gold medalists for Germany
Olympic silver medalists for Germany
Olympic bronze medalists for Germany
Cross-country mountain bikers
Olympic medalists in cycling
Medalists at the 2012 Summer Olympics
Medalists at the 2008 Summer Olympics
Medalists at the 2004 Summer Olympics
Cyclists from Baden-Württemberg
UCI Mountain Bike World Champions (women)
Recipients of the Order of Merit of Baden-Württemberg
German mountain bikers
20th-century German women
21st-century German women